Luisa Estela Fuentes Quijandría (born 19 August 1948, in Ica), more known as Lucha Fuentes  is retired volleyball player from Peru who played with the Peru national team in the 1968 Summer Olympics and the 1976 Summer Olympics.

Career 
Luisa Fuentes was born on 19 August 1948 in Ica. Her father was player Félix Fuentes and of the iqueña Estela Quijandría. When she was 14 years old she was discovered by Akira Kato and before she turned 15 years she was playing in Lima by the Divine School Teacher.

Fuentes won the silver medal in the 1967 Pan American Games and won the 1967 South American championship gold medal and was fourth in the 1967 FIVB World Championship. She was fourth in the 1968 Summer Olympics and silver medalist in the 1969 South American Championship. She ranked 14th in the 1970 FIVB World Championship in Bulgaria.

She won the silver medal in the 1971 Pan American Games and gold in the 1971 South American Championship
She claimed the championship in the 1973 South American Championship and eight in the 1974 FIVB World Championship. She won the 1975 Pan-American Games silver medal and gold in the 1975 South American Championship. She was seventh in the 1976 Summer Olympics and champion in the 1977 South American Championship.

In the 1978 FIVB World Championship she ranked in tenth place.
She won the silver medal in the 1979 Pan American Games and finished her career with the gold medal in the 1979 South American Championship in Santa Fe, Argentina.
She fought to popularize volleyball in Peru. In the year 2000, she was nominated by the international federation in the election to the best player of the 20th century.

She went on to become professor of the Sportive Academies Pupils of the Foundation Telefónica, where 300 girls and boys between 9 and 14 participated, but she closed the academy in 2015. Fuentes received the Laureles Deportivos merit award and was selected many times sportsperson of the year.

References

Volleyball players at the 1968 Summer Olympics
Volleyball players at the 1976 Summer Olympics
1948 births
Peruvian women's volleyball players
Olympic volleyball players of Peru
Living people
Pan American Games silver medalists for Peru
Pan American Games medalists in volleyball
Volleyball players at the 1967 Pan American Games
Volleyball players at the 1971 Pan American Games
Volleyball players at the 1979 Pan American Games
Medalists at the 1967 Pan American Games
Volleyball players at the 1975 Pan American Games
Medalists at the 1971 Pan American Games
Medalists at the 1975 Pan American Games
Medalists at the 1979 Pan American Games
20th-century Peruvian women